Osei Kyeretwie Senior High School is a coed boarding school in Kumasi, Ashanti Region, Ghana.

History 
Osei Kyeretwie Senior High school (known as OKESS) was established in July 1937 as the first secondary school in the Asante region. The school, formerly known as Asante Collegiate started as a private educational institution with just a handful of all boys’ students by the late Rev. J.T. Robert. After many years of private management, the school was taken over by the ministry of education in September, 1958; relocated it to Dichemso in September 1968; and renamed  as Osei Kyeretwie (after Nana Sir Osei Ageyman Prempeh II, Otomfuo, the Asantehene) who was known in private life as Obarima Osei Kyeretwie. In 1970, the current Tafo site of about 168-acre land was allocated to enable the school build permanent campus; the school has through 34 years operated from both the Dichemso and Tafo campuses. Following persistent pressures to move, the government eventually agreed and moved the whole school to the new site at Tafo in 2004. The philosophy or motto of the school is ‘’service to God and humanity”. Products of the school are affectionately called ‘’AHENEMAA’’…princes and princesses.

Residence
There are six houses:
Aggrey
Prempeh
Anokye
Sarbah
Bray
Nkansah Dwamenah

Notable alumni
Zuta Mary Nartey, javelin thrower
Bernard Nyarko, actor, comedian and preacher
Georgina Opoku Amankwah, lawyer and former deputy Chairperson Electoral Commission of Ghana

Notes

External links 
MP Builds Gym For OKESS
OKESS celebrates 75th Anniversary - Ghana News Agency
SEI KYERETWIE SECONDARY SCHOOL

Boarding schools in Ghana
Educational institutions established in 1937
1937 establishments in the British Empire
1930s establishments in Gold Coast (British colony)
High schools in Ghana
Education in Kumasi